Jim Cannon is a Scottish curler.

His wife is fellow Scottish curler Christine Cannon.

Teams

References

External links
 

Living people

Scottish male curlers
European curling champions

Year of birth missing (living people)